Aweil Airport is an airport serving the town of Aweil, in South Sudan.

Location
Aweil Airport  is located in Aweil Central County in Aweil State, in the town of Aweil, near the international border with the Republic of Sudan and the border with Abyei Region. The airport was formerly located downtown, within the central business district of Aweil. In 2011, this facility was closed and a new airport northwest of Aweil opened.

The geographic coordinates of this airport are: 8° 47' 35.73"N, 27° 21' 37.82"E (Latitude: 8.793261; Longitude: 27.360506).

Overview
Aweil Airport is a small civilian airport that serves the town of Aweil and surrounding communities. Southern Star Airlines provided scheduled air service on Wednesdays and Sundays to Juba until their bankruptcy in 2012.

Airlines and destinations

See also
 Aweil
 Northern Bahr el Ghazal
 Bahr el Ghazal
 List of airports in South Sudan

References

External links
 Location of Aweil Airport At Google Maps

Airports in South Sudan
Bahr el Ghazal
Northern Bahr el Ghazal